Maelstrom was a reversing Shoot the Chute dark ride attraction located in the Epcot theme park at Walt Disney World Resort in Florida. Designed by Walt Disney Imagineering, the ride opened on July 5, 1988, in the Norway Pavilion of the park's World Showcase section. It was a mix between a  log chute and a traditional film attraction. Visitors rode boats patterned after longships that passed through various scenes that featured audio-animatronic figures. The attraction was originally supposed to be called SeaVenture, with the entrance sign during construction even displaying it as such. But sometime between March 1988 and the ride's opening, it was changed to Maelstrom.

Closing
On September 12, 2014, it was announced that the ride would be replaced by an attraction based on Disney's 2013 3D computer-animated musical film Frozen. Maelstrom's final day of operation was October 5, 2014.

Frozen Ever After opened on June 21, 2016.

The ride
Riders departed from a dock traveling by boat, which turned a corner into a dark tunnel and up the flume's lift hill. A voice tells riders that "those who seek the spirit of Norway face peril and adventure, but more often find beauty and charm."  Arriving at the top of the hill, a lit face of the Germanic god Odin hovered above. Riders passed through scenes of seafarers and maritime villages depicting a mythological version of Norway's Viking days. Entering a marsh, the boat would come face to face with audio-animatronic depictions of a Nokken and a three-headed troll. The trolls, angered by the trespassing boat, cast a spell onto riders as the vehicle began to move backward rapidly, accelerated by hidden conveyor belts underneath the water's surface. The boats floated briskly past scenes of Atlantic puffins, polar bears and living trees, before coming to a stop on the edge of another waterfall, exposing the Norway pavilion's main thoroughfare. The backwards edge of the boat peeked out through the facade as the track pivoted to let the vehicle travel forward again. Correctly oriented, the boats plunged forward down a  flume into a stormy depiction of the North Sea. After passing very close to an oil rig, the ride came to an abrupt end in a calm harbor of a small village, where the narrator announced, "Norway's spirit has always been, and  will always be adventure." As guests exited the ride, they had the option of watching a 5-minute tourism film, "The Spirit of Norway", which highlighted various attractions in Norway including skiing, hiking, and Kjerag mountain.

Hidden Mickeys on the ride included:
In the ride's loading area, a large painted mural included many people and elements from Norway's history. Hidden in this painting was a Viking whose helmet had Mickey Mouse ears, and another figure wearing a Mickey Mouse watch.
Inside the stave church, King Olaf II had a small Mickey embroidered on his tunic, near his right thigh.

See also
List of Epcot attractions

References

Amusement rides introduced in 1988
Amusement rides that closed in 2014
Audio-Animatronic attractions
Dark rides
Epcot
Former Walt Disney Parks and Resorts attractions
Norway in fiction
Walt Disney Parks and Resorts gentle boat rides
World Showcase
1988 establishments in Florida
2014 disestablishments in Florida